The Non-Permanent Active Militia (NPAM) was the name of Canada's part-time volunteer military force from 1855 to 1940.  The NPAM (also called "the Militia" though that term could also encompass the full-time standing army known as the Permanent Active Militia (PAM)) was composed of several dozen infantry battalions (redesignated as regiments in 1900) and cavalry regiments.  With the withdrawal of the British forces in Canada after the turn of the 20th century, supporting corps were created in Canada as part of both the PAM and the NPAM.

History
The NPAM was established in 1855 by the Militia Act passed by the Province of Canada. After Confederation in 1867, militia units of Canada, Nova Scotia and New Brunswick were given three months to re-enrol in the militia of the new federation.

At the beginning of the 20th century, NPAM did not provide Canada a standing army ready for immediate action, although it did provide the country the ability to mobilize a force should the need arise. In the decade prior to the start of World War I, the nominal strength of NPAM increased from 36,000 to 55,000 soldiers.  

The NPAM did not mobilize during the First World War, though large drafts of NPAM men went into the field force created in 1914 for that conflict, the Canadian Expeditionary Force.  Some CEF units adopted regimental traditions from NPAM units. Following the war, the Otter Committee created a unique set of perpetuations, whereby the reorganized NPAM carried on the traditions of both the CEF and the prewar Militia in the Canadian Militia. 

On the eve of World War II, NPAM had 5,272 officers, and 41,249 soldiers of all other ranks. In 1940, the NPAM was redesignated the Canadian Army (Reserve); following World War II it was re-designated the Canadian Army Reserve Force, then the Canadian Army (Militia), and finally became the reserve component of Force Mobile Command following Unification on February 1, 1968. However, the historic title "Militia" continued to be applied to the reserve component of Canada's land forces.

See also 
 Canadian Forces Primary Reserve
 History of the Canadian Army
 List of regiments of cavalry of the Canadian Militia (1900–1920)

References

External links
canadiansoldiers.com article on lineage of the Canadian Army
Canadian Militia
Regiments of Canada
Military history of Canada
Military units and formations established in 1867
Military units and formations disestablished in 1940
Militias